The pale-chinned blue flycatcher or Brook's flycatcher (Cyornis poliogenys) is a species of bird in the family Muscicapidae. It is a sparrow-sized bird.
Male is bluish-grey on upper parts, rufous throat and white below.
Its nesting season is April–June.

Distribution
It is found in Bangladesh, Bhutan, China, India, Myanmar, and Nepal.
Its natural habitat is subtropical or tropical moist lowland forests.

References

pale-chinned blue flycatcher
Birds of Bhutan
Birds of India
Birds of Northeast India
Birds of Bangladesh
Birds of Myanmar
Birds of Yunnan
pale-chinned blue flycatcher
Taxonomy articles created by Polbot